Li Zhe and Jose Statham were the defending champions, but Statham chose not to defend his title. Li partnered Yi Chu-huan instead. Li lost in the first round to Kwon Soon-woo and Lee Duck-hee.

Hsieh Cheng-peng and Yang Tsung-hua won the title by a walkover following the withdrawal of Nicolás Barrientos and Ruben Gonzales in the final.

Seeds

Draw

References
 Main Draw

Gimcheon Open ATP Challenger - Doubles
2016 Doubles